Natalia is a city in Medina County, Texas, United States. The population was 1,202 at the 2020 census. It was founded in 1912 and was named after Natalie Pearson Nicholson, daughter of Frederick Stark Pearson, engineer, designer and builder of the Medina Dam.

Natalia is part of the San Antonio Metropolitan Statistical Area.

Geography

Natalia is located at  (29.188744, –98.857931). This is about 30 mi (48 km) southwest of Downtown San Antonio in Medina County.

Natalia is located on State Highway 132 and is adjacent to Interstate 35.

Demographics

2020 census

As of the 2020 United States census, there were 1,202 people, 359 households, and 265 families residing in the city.

2000 census
As of the census of 2000, there were 1,663 people, 513 households, and 397 families residing in the city. The population density was 1,630.4 people per square mile (629.5/km). There were 584 housing units at an average density of 572.5/sq mi (221.1/km). The racial makeup of the city was 65.54% White, 1.14% African American, 0.42% Native American, 0.18% Asian, 0.12% Pacific Islander, 29.28% from other races, and 3.31% from two or more races. Hispanic or Latino of any race were 79.43% of the population.

There were 513 households, out of which 44.2% had children under the age of 18 living with them, 54.0% were married couples living together, 18.9% had a female householder with no husband present, and 22.6% were non-families. 19.3% of all households were made up of individuals, and 8.6% had someone living alone who was 65 years of age or older. The average household size was 3.24 and the average family size was 3.73.

In the city, the population was spread out, with 36.3% under the age of 18, 8.4% from 18 to 24, 28.8% from 25 to 44, 16.4% from 45 to 64, and 10.2% who were 65 years of age or older. The median age was 29 years. For every 100 females, there were 99.4 males. For every 100 females age 18 and over, there were 90.0 males.

The median income for a household in the city was $22,557, and the median income for a family was $25,690. Males had a median income of $19,943 versus $16,484 for females. The per capita income for the city was $8,583. About 27.2% of families and 33.4% of the population were below the poverty line, including 42.7% of those under age 18 and 24.6% of those age 65 or over.

Education 
Natalia is served by the Natalia Independent School District.

Climate
The climate in this area is characterized by hot, humid summers and generally mild to cool winters.  According to the Köppen Climate Classification system, Natalia has a humid subtropical climate, abbreviated "Cfa" on climate maps.

References

External links
 Handbook of Texas Online: Natalia, Texas

Cities in Texas
Cities in Medina County, Texas
Greater San Antonio
Populated places established in 1912
1912 establishments in Texas